The Old Mill Inn is a public house and country inn in Pitlochry, Perth and Kinross, Scotland. A former gristmill dating to the 18th century, it won the Scottish Inn of the Year in 2016. It has won several other awards.

The building still has a functioning water wheel.

References

External links

Pubs in Scotland

18th-century establishments in Scotland
Buildings and structures in Pitlochry